Vijaya Samudiyak Sikshya Sadan (VSSS), is a community school in Gaindakot Nawalparasi, Nepal. It was established in 1993 (2058 BS).

Location
VSSS is situated in the mid-part of Gaindakot municipality. It is surrounded by many NGOs (VDRC Nepal, Trinetra Nepal), a financial institution known (VYCCU) and a radio station of the western region of Nepal known as Vijaya FM.

History
The school opened in 1993, when it was named of New Children Home English Boarding School. Eight years later it was handled by VDRC Nepal, an NGO in mid-Nepal. This organisation handed the institution to VISEC. After that, the school was opened to the people and organisations of Nawalparasi. The school has more than 200 people and eight organisations which contribute directly to the it. Until 2010 (2066 BS), it provided education up to secondary level. VSSS later became known as Vijaya Community Higher Secondary School.

See also
 List of schools in Nepal

References 

Schools in Nepal
Secondary schools in Nepal
1993 establishments in Nepal
Boarding schools in Nepal
Educational institutions established in 1993
Buildings and structures in Nawalpur District